Her Decision is a 1918 American silent drama film directed by Jack Conway and starring Gloria Swanson. It is not known whether the film currently survives, and it may be a lost film.

Plot
As described in a film magazine, after her sister Inah (Forrest) is betrayed by a dissolute young millionaire, Phyllis Dunbar (Swanson) seeks the aid of her fiance Bobbie Warner (Foss), but is refused. In desperation she turns to Martin Rankin (Sherry), her employer, who previously had proposed to her but had been refused, with an offer of marriage if he will see her sister through her trouble. Martin finally agrees and the ceremony is performed. Martin assures his young bride that they will live together for one year as pals, and if he does not win her love in that time he will give her the freedom to marry Bobbie. After a visit to a dance hall by Bobbie dispels any remaining love between the two, Phyllis returns to her home and gives her love freely to Martin.

Cast
 Gloria Swanson as Phyllis Dunbar
 J. Barney Sherry as Martin Rankin
 Darrell Foss as Bobbie Warner
 Ann Forrest as Inah Dunbar (credited as Ann Kroman)

Reception
Like many American films of the time, Her Decision was subject to cuts and restrictions by city and state film censorship boards. For example, the Chicago Board of Censors issued an Adults Only permit for the film.

References

External links

1918 films
1918 drama films
Silent American drama films
American silent feature films
American black-and-white films
Films directed by Jack Conway
Triangle Film Corporation films
1910s American films